Fruitas Holdings, Inc. is a food company in the Philippines which maintains several food and beverage kiosk chains including its flagship brand, Fruitas. It is publicly listed at the Philippine Stock Exchange.

History
Fruitas Holdings, Inc. traces its history to the Lush Enterprises Corporation which was incorporated in 2000. The company opened the first outlet of its flagship fruit juice and shake brand, Fruitas in 2002. Fruitas Holdings itself was incorporated and registered with the Securities and Exchange Commission on February 18, 2015. The holding company was established to manage Fruitas and at least 23 other food and beverage kiosk brands.

In March 2020, Fruitas Holdings announced plans of acquiring 100% of food delivery service company CocoDelivery.

References

Companies listed on the Philippine Stock Exchange
Food and drink companies of the Philippines